Religious art is a visual representation of religious ideologies and their relationship with humans. Sacred art directly relates to religious art in the sense that its purpose is for worship and religious practices. According to one set of definitions, artworks that are inspired by religion but are not considered traditionally sacred remain under the umbrella term of religious art, but not sacred art.

Buddhist art

Buddhist art originated on the Indian subcontinent following the historical life of Siddhartha Gautama, 6th to 5th century BC, and thereafter evolved by contact with other cultures as it spread throughout Asia and the world.

Buddhist art followed believers as the dharma spread, adapted, and evolved in each new host country. It developed to the north through Central Asia and into Eastern Asia to form the Northern branch of Buddhist art.

Buddhist art followed to the east as far as Southeast Asia to form the Southern branch of Buddhist art.

In India, the Buddhist art flourished and even influenced the development of Hindu art, until Buddhism nearly disappeared in India around the 10th century due in part to the vigorous expansion of Islam alongside Hinduism.

Tibetan Buddhist art
Most Tibetan Buddhist artforms are related to the practice of Vajrayana or Buddhist tantra.
Tibetan art includes thangkas and mandalas, often including depictions of Buddhas and bodhisattvas. Creation of Buddhist art is usually done as a meditation as well as creating an object as aid to meditation. An example of this is the creation of a sand mandala by monks; before and after the construction prayers are recited, and the form of the mandala represents the pure surroundings (palace) of a Buddha on which is meditated to train the mind. The work is rarely, if ever, signed by the artist. Other Tibetan Buddhist art includes metal ritual objects, such as the vajra and the phurba.

Indian Buddhist art
Two places suggest more vividly than any others the vitality of Buddhist cave painting from about the 5th century AD. One is Ajanta, a site in India long forgotten until discovered in 1817. The other is Dunhuang, one of the great oasis staging posts on the Silk Road...The paintings range from calm devotional images of the Buddha to lively and crowded scenes, often featuring the seductively full-breasted and narrow-waisted women more familiar in Indian sculpture than in painting.

Christian art

Christian sacred art is produced in an attempt to illustrate, supplement and portray in tangible form the principles of Christianity, though other definitions are possible. It is to make imagery of the different beliefs in the world and what it looks like. Most Christian groups use or have used art to some extent, although some have had strong objections to some forms of religious image, and there have been major periods of iconoclasm within Christianity.

Most Christian art is allusive, or built around themes familiar to the intended observer. Images of Jesus and narrative scenes from the Life of Christ are the most common subjects, especially the images of Christ on the Cross.

Scenes from the Old Testament play a part in the art of most Christian denominations. Images of the Virgin Mary, holding the infant Jesus, and images of saints are much rarer in Protestant art than that of Roman Catholicism and Eastern Orthodoxy.

For the benefit of the illiterate, an elaborate iconographic system developed to conclusively identify scenes. For example, Saint Agnes depicted with a lamb, Saint Peter with keys, Saint Patrick with a shamrock. Each saint holds or is associated with attributes and symbols in sacred art.

History

Early Christian art survives from dates near the origins of Christianity. The oldest surviving Christian paintings are from the site at Megiddo, dated to around the year 70, and the oldest Christian sculptures are from sarcophagi, dating to the beginning of the 2nd century. Until the adoption of Christianity by Constantine Christian art derived its style and much of its iconography from popular Roman art, but from this point grand Christian buildings built under imperial patronage brought a need for Christian versions of Roman elite and official art, of which mosaics in churches in Rome are the most prominent surviving examples.

During the development of early Christian art in the Byzantine empire (see Byzantine art), a more abstract aesthetic replaced the naturalism previously established in Hellenistic art. This new style was hieratic, meaning its primary purpose was to convey religious meaning rather than accurately render objects and people. Realistic perspective, proportions, light and colour were ignored in favour of geometric simplification of forms, reverse perspective and standardized conventions to portray individuals and events. The controversy over the use of graven images, the interpretation of the Second Commandment, and the crisis of Byzantine Iconoclasm led to a standardization of religious imagery within the Eastern Orthodoxy.

The Renaissance saw an increase in monumental secular works, but until the Protestant Reformation Christian art continued to be produced in great quantities, both for churches and clergy and for the laity. During this time, Michelangelo Buonarroti painted the Sistine Chapel and carved the famous Pietà, Gianlorenzo Bernini created the massive columns in St. Peter's Basilica, and Leonardo da Vinci painted the Last Supper. The Reformation had a huge effect on Christian art, rapidly bringing the production of public Christian art to a virtual halt in Protestant countries, and causing the destruction of most of the art that already existed.

As a secular, non-sectarian, universal notion of art arose in 19th-century Western Europe, secular artists occasionally treated Christian themes (Bouguereau, Manet). Only rarely was a Christian artist included in the historical canon (such as Rouault or Stanley Spencer). However many modern artists such as Eric Gill, Marc Chagall, Henri Matisse, Jacob Epstein, Elisabeth Frink and Graham Sutherland have produced well-known works of art for churches. Through a social interpretation of Christianity, Fritz von Uhde also revived the interest in sacred art, through the depiction of Jesus in ordinary places in life.

Since the advent of printing, the sale of reproductions of pious works has been a major element of popular Christian culture. In the 19th century, this included genre painters such as Mihály Munkácsy. The invention of color lithography led to broad circulation of holy cards. In the modern era, companies specializing in modern commercial Christian artists such as Thomas Blackshear and Thomas Kinkade, although widely regarded in the fine art world as kitsch, have been very successful.

The last part of the 20th and the first part of the 21st century have seen a focused effort by artists who claim faith in Christ to re-establish art with themes that revolve around faith, Christ, God, the Church, the Bible and other classic Christian themes as worthy of respect by the secular art world. Artists such as Makoto Fujimura have had significant influence both in sacred and secular arts. Other notable artists include Larry D. Alexander, Gary P. Bergel, Carlos Cazares, Bruce Herman, Deborah Sokolove, and John August Swanson.

Confucian art 

Confucian art is art inspired by the writings of Confucius, and Confucian teachings. Confucian art originated in China, then spread westwards on the Silk road, southward down to southern China and then onto Southeast Asia, and eastwards through northern China on to Japan and Korea. While it still maintains a strong influence within Indonesia, Confucian influence on western art has been limited. While Confucian themes enjoyed representation in Chinese art centers, they are fewer in comparison to the number of artworks that are about or influenced by Daoism and Buddhism.

Hindu art

Hinduism, with its 1 billion followers, it makes up about 15% of the world's population and as such the culture that ensues it is full of different aspects of life that are effected by art.  There are 64 traditional arts that are followed that start with the classics of music and range all the way to the application and adornment of jewellery.  Since religion and culture are inseparable with Hinduism recurring symbols such as the gods and their reincarnations, the lotus flower, extra limbs, and even the traditional arts make their appearances in many sculptures, paintings, music, and dance.

Islamic  art

A prohibition against depicting representational images in religious art, as well as the naturally decorative nature of Arabic script, led to the use of calligraphic decorations, which usually involved repeating geometrical patterns and vegetal forms (arabesques) that expressed ideals of order and nature. These were used on religious architecture, carpets, and handwritten documents. Islamic art has reflected this balanced, harmonious world-view. It focuses on spiritual essence rather than physical form.

While there has been an aversion to potential idol worship through Islamic history, this is a distinctly modern Sunni view. Persian miniatures, along with medieval depictions of Muhammad and angels in Islam, stand as prominent examples contrary to the modern Sunni tradition. Also, Shi'a Muslims are much less averse to the depiction of figures, including the Prophet's as long as the depiction is respectful.

Figure representation
The Islamic resistance to the representation of living beings ultimately stems from the belief that the creation of living forms is unique to God. It is for this reason that the role of images and image makers has been controversial.

The strongest statements on the subject of figural depiction are made in the Hadith (Traditions of the Prophet), where painters are challenged to "breathe life" into their creations and threatened with punishment on the Day of Judgment. 

The Qur'an is less specific but condemns idolatry and uses the Arabic term musawwir ("maker of forms", or artist) as an epithet for God. Partially as a result of this religious sentiment, figures in painting were often stylized and, in some cases, the destruction of figurative artworks occurred. Iconoclasm was previously known in the Byzantine period and aniconicism was a feature of the Judaic world, thus placing the Islamic objection to figurative representations within a larger context. As ornament, however, figures were largely devoid of any larger significance and perhaps therefore posed less challenge.
As with other forms of Islamic ornamentation, artists freely adapted and stylized basic human and animal forms, giving rise to a great variety of figural-based designs.

Arabesque

Calligraphy

Calligraphy is a highly regarded element of Islamic art. The Qur'an was transmitted in Arabic, and inherent within the Arabic script is the potential for ornamental forms. The employment of calligraphy as ornament had a definite aesthetic appeal but often also included an underlying talismanic component. While most works of art had legible inscriptions, not all Muslims would have been able to read them. One should always keep in mind, however, that calligraphy is principally a means to transmit a text, albeit in a decorative form.
From its simple and primitive early examples of the 5th and 6th century AD, the Arabic alphabet developed rapidly after the rise of Islam in the 7th century into a beautiful form of art. The main two families of calligraphic styles were the dry styles, called generally the Kufic, and the soft cursive styles, which include Naskhi, Thuluth, Nastaliq and many others.

Geometry

Geometric patterns make up one of the three nonfigural types of decoration in Islamic art. Whether isolated or used in combination with nonfigural ornamentation or figural representation, geometric patterns are popularly associated with Islamic art, largely due to their aniconic quality. These abstract designs not only adorn the surfaces of monumental Islamic architecture but also function as the major decorative element on a vast array of objects of all types.

Jain art 

Jain art refers to religious works of art associated with Jainism. Even though Jainism spread only in some parts of India, it has made a significant contribution to Indian art and architecture.

Mandaean art 

Mandaean art can be found in illustrated manuscript scrolls called diwan. Mandaean scroll illustrations, usually labeled with lengthy written explanations, typically contain abstract geometric drawings of uthras that are reminiscent of cubism or prehistoric rock art.

Sikh art 

The art, culture, identity and societies of the Sikhs has been merged with different locality and ethnicity of different Sikhs into categories such as 'Agrahari Sikhs', 'Dakhni Sikhs' and 'Assamese Sikhs'; however there has emerged a niche cultural phenomenon that can be described as 'Political Sikh'.  The art of diaspora Sikhs such as Amarjeet Kaur Nandhra, and Amrit and Rabindra Kaur Singh (The Singh Twins), is partly informed by their Sikh spirituality and influence.

Taoist art

Taoist art (also spelled as Daoist art) relates to the Taoist philosophy and narratives of Lao-tzu (also spelled as Laozi) that promote "living simply and honestly and in harmony with nature."

See also
Religious image
Spiritualist art

References

Further reading

 Hein, David. “Christianity and the Arts.” The Living Church, May 4, 2014, 8–11.

Morgan, David (1998). Visual Piety: A History and Theory of Popular Religious Images. Berkeley, CA: University of California Press.
Sauchelli, Andrea (2016). The Will to Make‐Believe: Religious Fictionalism, Religious Beliefs, and the Value of Art. Philosophy and Phenomenological Research, 93, 3.
 Charlene Spretnak, The Spiritual Dynamic in Modern Art : Art History Reconsidered, 1800 to the Present.
 Veith, Gene Edward, junior. The Gift of Art: the Place of the Arts in Scripture. Downers Grove, Ill.: Inter-Varsity Press, 1983. 130 p.

External links

 
Visual arts genres